is a Japanese hurdler who specialises in the 400 metres hurdles. He competed at the 2007 World Championships.

Personal best

International competition

References

External links

Masahira Yoshikata at JAAF 
Masahira Yoshikata at TBS  (archived)

1982 births
Living people
Japanese male hurdlers
Sportspeople from Fukuoka Prefecture
World Athletics Championships athletes for Japan
Competitors at the 2003 Summer Universiade